Widdershins is the ninth studio album by American singer-songwriter Grant-Lee Phillips. It was released on February 23, 2018 under Yep Roc Records.

Production
The album was recorded over a four-day period at the Sound Emporium in Nashville, Tennessee. It was mixed by Tucker Martine and engineered by Mike Stankiewicz.

Critical reception
Widdershins was met with "generally favorable" reviews from critics. At Metacritic, which assigns a weighted average rating out of 100 to reviews from mainstream publications, this release received an average score of 78, based on 8 reviews. Aggregator Album of the Year gave the release a 78 out of 100 based on a critical consensus of 5 reviews.

Mark Deming of AllMusic said the album "is full of joy and purpose, and Phillips has married them to a great set of hooky tunes with a folk-rock slant. He hasn't entirely abandoned the moody undertow that's always been a part of his music, but the unspoken message behind these songs is that this is not a time to brood, and Phillips has rarely sounded quite this lively and direct." Chris Roberts from Classic Rock said: "Whether it’s sideways social comment blazing with guitars, or poignant self-reflection with undulating melodies, this showcases his soulful, vulnerable voice, which never fails to catch every colour in a song. Locating the sweet spot where spontaneity and polish meet, Widdershins swings in all the right directions."

Track listing

Personnel

Musicians
 Grant-Lee Phillips – primary artist, guitar, vocals, producer
 Jerry Roe – drums
 Lex Price – bass

Production
 Mike Stankiewicz – engineer
 John Baldwin – mastering
 Nathan Golub – design
 Tucker Martine – mixing

References

2018 albums
Grant-Lee Phillips albums
Yep Roc Records albums